Lavrio or Laurium ((later ); from Middle Ages until 1908: Εργαστήρια Ergastiria) is a town in southeastern part of Attica, Greece. It is part of Athens metropolitan area and the seat of the municipality of Lavreotiki. Laurium was famous in Classical antiquity for its silver mines, which was one of the chief sources of revenue of the Athenian state. The metallic silver was mainly used for coinage. The Archaeological Museum of Lavrion shows much of the story of these mines.

It is located about 60 km SE of Athens city center, SE of Keratea and N of Cape Sounio. Laurium is situated on a bay overlooking the island of Makronisos (ancient times: Helena) in the east.  The port is in the middle and gridded streets cover the residential area of Lavrio.  GR-89 runs through Lavrio and ends south in Sounio.

History

The modern town of Lavrio is at the site of the ancient village of Thoricus; its name is taken from that of the entire region of the Mines of Laurium.

The earliest evidence for mining dates to the beginning of the Bronze Age, ca. 3200 BC.

Systematic exploitation of mineral resources seem to have begun in the 6th century BC under Peisistratus. 
After the battle of Marathon, Themistocles persuaded the Athenians to devote the anticipated revenue derived from a major silver vein strike in the mines of Laurion circa 483 BC to expanding the Athenian fleet to 200 triremes, and thus laid the foundation of the Athenian naval power. The mines, which were the property of the state, were usually farmed out for a certain fixed sum and a percentage on the working; slave labour was exclusively employed. An unrecorded number were children. It was a miserable, dangerous, and brief life. As many as 20,000 slaves were employed at the height of the mining. A silver mint (Argyrocopeum) was at Laurion.

Towards the end of the 5th century, the output fell, partly owing to the Spartan occupation of Decelea. But the mines continued to be worked, though Strabo records that in his time the tailings were being worked over, and Pausanias speaks of the mines as a thing of the past. The ancient workings, consisting of shafts and galleries for excavating the ore, and washing tables for concentrating the ore, may still be seen at many locations. There were well engineered tanks and reservoirs to collect rainwater for washing the ore since abundant supplies from streams or rivers was impossible at the site.

The mines were reworked in the late 19th century by French and Greek companies, but mainly for lead, manganese and cadmium. In 1896 a strike from the miners was violently confronted by the mining company's guards resulting in the death of two workers. The miners responded by destroying the company's offices and killing the guards. The government then sent police forces to support the company's interests against the strikers. Further clashes between workers and the police occurred to which the government replied by sending the military against the striking workers resulting in more workers' deaths. The strike ended violently with most of the strikers' demands not being fulfilled and with a military force being permanently established to patrol the miners. 

The  Mineralogical Museum of Lavrion comprises samples of minerals from the region of Lavrion.

Climate

Lavrio, owing to its location in the Athens Riviera, has a hot semi-arid climate. It has mild winters and hot summers, with particularly warm summer nights. The driest months are July and August while the rainiest period is during the fall. According to the station of the National Observatory of Athens, Lavrio has never recorded an air frost.

Facilities

The Eleftherios Venizelos International Airport is 35 km away from Lavrio or about 30 minutes drive. 
Lavrio is connected to Athens by car using the Lavrio/Sounio Leoforos (Highway) and then Attiki Odos. This trip takes about an hour. 
A quite convenient solution to go to Athens is to "park and drive". Drive from Lavrio to Koropi Train Station and there take the suburban railway or metro that goes straight to Athens center. (30 minutes drive + 30 minutes train)

Lavrio was the terminal station of the Athens-Lavrion Railway, which was abandoned in 1957.

The mining town of Laurium, Michigan was named after the famous Greek Laurium.

Sports
Laurium hosts the football club Olympiacos Laurium, which played in the Gamma Ethniki in the past, and the basketball club Lavrio B.C., which plays in the Basket League.

Twin towns
  Aleksinac, Serbia
  Mangalia, Romania

See also
 List of municipalities of Attica

References

Sources
 Édouard Ardaillon, "Les Mines du Laurion dans l'antiquité", No. Ixxvii. of the Bibliothéque des Ecoles francaises d'Athênes et de Rome.

External links

 About the abandoned railway line Athens – Lavrio 
 A video podcast made by the MoneyMuseum on the importance of Laurion's silver mines for Greek coinage.
 A Virtual tour of the town of Lavrio

Populated places in East Attica
Mediterranean port cities and towns in Greece
Silver mines in Greece
Mining communities in Greece
Geography of ancient Attica
Ancient Greek archaeological sites in Greece
Archaeological sites in Attica
Ports and harbours of Greece